Danielle Kristie Sharp (born 21 August 1991) is an English model, actress and video games streamer.  


Early life 
Danielle Sharp was born in Grimsby, then moved to Ulceby with her family. She attended Matthew Humberstone School, Baysgarth School in Barton-upon-Humber and John Leggott College in Scunthorpe.

She attended the University of Central Lancashire in Preston, graduating with a Bachelor of Arts degree in Fashion Brand Management in 2013.

Career 
While still at university, she was named sexiest student in Britain by Loaded magazine (November 2011 issue). She became a staple of lads mags in Britain in 2012 and 2013, appearing repeatedly in Front, Nuts (whose readers voted her sixth among Nuts''' 100 Sexiest Babes (30 Nov issue)) and FHM'' (where she was voted number 100 on the FHM 100 Sexiest of 2015).

With the rise of social media her following grew to around 243,000 on Instagram and 55,600 on Twitter.

Acting 
She began acting in 2014, studying drama at ICAT and became an active member of
The Actors Centre in London where she encountered the Meisner technique, which she went on to study at The Impulse Company and graduated in 2016.

She appeared alongside David Walliams in the music video for "Don't Even Try" by Bryan Adams in the same year.

See also

 The Sun newspaper

References

External links
 Front Magazine Profile
 Danielle Sharp at mandatory.com
 

1991 births
Living people
English female models
Glamour models
Page 3 girls
People from Grimsby
Actresses from Lincolnshire